Rogan painting, is an art of cloth printing practiced all over Gujarat, Peshawar and Sindh. In this craft, paint made from boiled oil and vegetable dyes is laid down on fabric using either a metal block (printing) or a stylus (painting). The craft nearly died out in the late 20th century, with rogan painting being practiced by only a few families in Qissa Khwani bazar of Peshawar in Pakistan and Gujrat of India. The name itself means oil and is borrowed from Persian into Urdu.

History
The process of applying this oil-based paint to fabric began among the Hindu And Muslim Khatri's, a community in Gujarat. Although the name, rogan (and some of the traditional designs) suggests an origin in indian culture, there are no reliable historic records to prove this. The word 'Rogan' comes from Persian, meaning varnish or oil.

Rogan painting was initially practiced in several locations in the gujarat region. The painted fabric was mostly purchased by women of the lower castes who wanted to decorate clothing and bed coverings for their weddings. Therefore, it was a seasonal art, with most of the work taking place during the several months when most weddings take place. During the rest of the year, the artisans would switch to other forms of work, such as agriculture.

With the rise of cheaper, machine-made textiles in the late 20th century, roghan-painted products became relatively more expensive, and many artists turned to other occupations. Ultimately, Few families in the Gujarat, continued the craft.

Resurgence of the art
In the late 20th and early 21st centuries, several factors came together to bring about a renewed interest in rogan art, especially painting. First, after the 2001 Gujarat earthquake, when much of the region was devastated, the water and electricity infrastructure was improved, new roads were built, and the number of flights into the region was increased, all of which led to an increase in tourism. Second, local cooperatives and non-profit groups helped local artisans, including roghan artists, to increase their market by selling in urban settings and online. Third, many members of the artisans family won state and national awards for their art, thus increasing the prestige of their work. Finally, in 2014, Prime Minister Narendra Modi visited the U.S. White House, and gave President Obama two roghan paintings including a tree of life. They were painted by Abdul Gafur Khatri, a national award winner.

In gujarat, the artisans introduced more contemporary products to appeal to tourists, such as bags, cushion covers, table cloths, wall hangings, and pillow covers. The tree of life continued to be a major motif. The number of tourists to the artisans workshop increased steadily in the 2010s to as many as 400 people per day, causing traffic jams in the village. In an attempt to keep up with increased demand, in 2010 the artisans began to train women for the first time. Previously, it was feared that women would spread the secrets of the craft when they married out of the family. In 2015, twenty women were working with the family in kutch gujarat.

Following the COVID-19 pandemic in 2020, a number of the tourists visiting them dropped significantly  and the women working with them left. Only family members were left to work on the craft.

Process of rogan printing
Rogan paint is produced by boiling castor oil for about two days and then adding vegetable pigments and a binding agent; the resulting paint is thick and shiny. The cloth that is painted or printed on is usually a dark color, which makes the intense colors stand out.

In rogan printing, the pattern is applied using metal blocks with patterns carved into them. In rogan painting, elaborate designs are produced freehand, by trailing thread-like strands of paint off of a stylus. Frequently, half of a design is painted, then the cloth is folded in half, transferring a mirror image to the other half of the fabric. The designs include floral motifs, animals, and local folk art.

Video of Rogan art

See also
 Woodblock printing on textiles

References

External links
 The Link Between Modi, Obama and the Village of Nirona in Kutch!
 Official website of the Nirvana Khatri family
 A video showing the process of rogan painting
 Rogan Art Painting Saree
 Rogan art Traditional Lehenga
 Rogan Art Traditional Blouse Piece
 Roghan art
 Roghan Art a fading culture; Kept alive by a family in Pakistan. https://www.fadingcultures.org/single-project-4

Textile printing
Textile arts of India
Gujarati culture
Culture of Kutch
Printed fabrics